Paulette Guinchard-Kunstler (3 October 1949 – 4 March 2021) was a French politician. She served on the National Assembly representing Doubs's 2nd constituency as a member of the Socialist Party.

Biography
In 1997, she was elected to the National Assembly, serving in Doubs's 2nd constituency. In 2001, she left the National Assembly following her appointment as Secretary of State for the Elderly by Prime Minister Lionel Jospin. That year, Robert Schwint announced his retirement as Mayor of Besançon. Guinchard-Kunstler's name was floated as a possibility, but Jean-Louis Fousseret obtained the Socialist Party nomination and eventually the seat.

In 2002, Guinchard-Kunstler returned to the National Assembly and became a vice president, alongside Hélène Mignon. On International Women's Day in 2005, she presided over the National Assembly and answered questions on television for one hour. In 2007, she became a part of the think tank , which was run by the Socialist Party. She decided not to seek reelection in the 2007 French legislative election.

In 2013, Guinchard-Kunstler became head of the Fondation de gérontologie. She then launched with  the Appel pour l'équité en faveur des aidants. The goal was to provide France's 10 million caregivers support and health protections. She achieved the rank of Officer of the Legion of Honour on 14 April 2017.

Paulette Guinchard-Kunstler died of assisted suicide in Switzerland on 4 March 2021 at the age of 71.

References

1949 births
2021 deaths
20th-century French women politicians
21st-century French women politicians
Socialist Party (France) politicians
Franche-Comté Regional Councillors
Deputies of the 11th National Assembly of the French Fifth Republic
Deputies of the 12th National Assembly of the French Fifth Republic
People from Doubs
Secretaries of State of France
Deaths by euthanasia
Officiers of the Légion d'honneur